The Comité Colbert is an association "to promote the concept of luxury."  The members are 81 French luxury brands. It was founded in 1954 by Jean-Jacques Guerlain.

Métiers or Trade Sectors
The association is divided into thirteen métiers or trade sectors. The sectors are:
Automobile
Crystal
Decoration
Faience and Porcelain
Fragrance and Cosmetic
Gastronomie
Gold and Precious Materials
Haute Couture / Fashion
Hospitality
Leather Goods
Publishing
Silver and Bronze
Wine and Spirits

The association adopted its first automobile brand in Bugatti in July 2015.

Members

 Baccarat
 Berluti
 Bernardaud
 Bonpoint
 Bollinger
 Charles Heidsieck
 Boucheron
 Breguet
 Bugatti
 Bussière
 Caron
 Cartier
 Céline
 Chanel
 Parfums Chanel
 Château Cheval Blanc
 Château Lafite Rothschild
 Château d'Yquem
 Chloé
 Christian Dior
 Parfums Christian Dior
 Christian Liaigre
 Christofle
 D. Porthault
 D. Wandrille
 Dalloyau
 Éditions Diane de Selliers
 Delisle
 Ercuis
 Eres
 Dr. Irena Eris
 Faïenceries de Gien
 Gucci 
 Flammarion Beaux livres
 Éditions de parfums Frédéric Malle
 George V
 Givenchy
 Parfums Givenchy
 Guerlain
 Hédiard
 Hermès
 Parfums Hermès
 Le Bristol
 Hôtel du Palais
 Plaza Athénée
 Hôtel Ritz Paris
 Jean Patou
 Jeanne Lanvin
 John Lobb Bootmaker
 Krug
 Lacoste
 Lancôme
 Le Meurice
 Lenôtre
 Leonard
 Longchamp
 Lorenz Bäumer Joaillier
 Louis Vuitton
 La Maison du Chocolat
 Maison Francis Kurkdjian
 Martell
 Mellerio dits Meller
 Oustau de Baumanière
 Perrier-Jouët
 Pierre Balmain
 Pierre Frey
 Pierre Hermé
Pierre Hardy
 Potel et Chabot
 Jean Puiforcat
 Orient-Express
 Rémy Martin
 Robert Haviland et C. Parlon
 Rochas
 Saint-Louis
 ST Dupont
 Taillevent
 Van Cleef & Arpels
 Veuve Clicquot Ponsardin
 Yves Delorme
 Yves Saint Laurent
 Yves Saint Laurent Beauté Perfums

References

External links
 Comité Colbert

1954 establishments in France
Brand management
Luxury brands